Richard Eyring "Rick" Turley Jr. (born February 18, 1956) is an American historian and genealogist.  He previously served as both an Assistant Church Historian of the Church of Jesus Christ of Latter-day Saints (LDS Church) and as managing director of the church's public affairs department.

Biography
Turley was born in Fort Worth, Texas, to Richard and Betty Jean Nickle Turley. His father, a nuclear engineer, scientist and professor, would later become a mission president and general authority of the LDS Church.

Turley attended high school in Salt Lake City, Utah, when he met Shirley Swensen. They would later marry in the Salt Lake Temple and have six children. Turley aspired to be a lawyer, by his father's urging, and an Institute of Religion teacher, by his deep personal interest in LDS Church history. From 1975 to 1977, Turley served as an LDS missionary to the Japan Tokyo Mission.

After returning from Japan, Turley studied at Brigham Young University (BYU) as a Spencer W. Kimball Scholar, receiving a B. A. in English in 1982. Then, at BYU's J. Reuben Clark Law School, he was editor of the law review and elected to the Order of the Coif. Upon graduation in April 1985, Turley received the Hugh B. Brown Barrister's Award for top classroom performance.

Church employment
After passing the Utah State Bar examination, Turley practiced law briefly before being hired by the LDS Church in January 1986. He was appointed assistant managing director of the Historical Department, to replace the retiring Earl Olson.

At this time, the department was already heavily involved in the investigation of Mark Hofmann, the historical documents forger who attempted to hide his fraud by murder during the previous October. Turley's legal training helped the department which had examined and acquired several Hoffman forgeries (though some argued it was to hide their controversy).

Watching the case unfold in the press and in books, Turley felt misconceptions lingered from the media frenzy. To tell the story from the perspectives of the murder victims and the LDS Church (which Turley believed had been misrepresented) he published Victims: The LDS Church and the Mark Hofmann Case in 1992 through the University of Illinois Press. Though he wrote the book without church direction, his trusted position granted him church leaders' support and access to interviews, diaries, journals, memoranda, and other records.

Expanded role
Turley was appointed managing director of the Historical Department in 1989, and in 1996 he also became managing director of the Family History Department. While over the family history department Turley oversaw the launching of familysearch.org.

In 2000, the Family History and Church History departments merged into the Family and Church History Department, over which Turley remained as managing director.

In these roles, Turley oversaw the Church Archives, the Church History Library, and the Museum of Church History and Art, the Family History Library, the FamilySearch Center, the Granite Mountain Records Vault, and over 4,000 branch family history centers. These comprise one of the largest collections of Mormon history, western history, and genealogy in the world. As a person of authority in LDS history and past defender of the church in the Hofmann controversy, Turley later became one of three official LDS Church respondents to a popular 2003 book critical of Mormonism, Under the Banner of Heaven by Jon Krakauer.

Digital projects
In the department, Turley managed several notable electronic projects.  FamilySearch, a massive genealogical database website, was launched in 1999. Other records were also released on CD-ROM, including the Freedman’s Bank (of African-American records), the Mormon Immigration Index, European Vital Records Indexes, and 1880s censuses, including the 1881 British Census, which won the Besterman/McColvin Award from the Library Association of Great Britain. For these efforts, and restoring several LDS historic sites, Turley received the Historic Preservation Medal from the Daughters of the American Revolution in 2004.

In 2002, BYU Press published Selected Collections From the Archives of The Church of Jesus Christ of Latter-day Saints, which Turley edited. On 74 DVDs, this released numerous important and rare early documents of the church, which some scholars and historians called "the most important event in modern Mormon publishing," and "an achievement of such significance that no praise, no matter how effusive, seems sufficiently laudatory."

Assistant Church Historian
More changes came to the department after Marlin K. Jensen became Church Historian in 2005. The department again staffed professional researchers, the Joseph Smith Papers Project sharply expanded, and a new Church History Library was announced.

On March 12, 2008, the Family and Church History Department announced it was becoming two departments again: the Family History Department and the Church History Department. In addition, Turley became the Assistant Church Historian, an ecclesiastical position that was unfilled for over 25 years. Steven L. Olsen, the department's associate managing director, took Turley's old position of managing director.

For his contributions to public history while overseeing the church's archives, records, museums, and historic sites, Turley was awarded the 2013 Herbert Feis Award from the American Historical Association.

Public affairs department
In April 2016, the church announced that Turley would move from the Church History Department and become the successor to Michael Otterson as the managing director of the church's public affairs department. The two worked closely together through a transition period until Otterson's departure in August, to accept an assignment as a temple president. Among other events and activities in this new role, Turley traveled to the Philippines in December 2017 where he gave three devotionals on Church History.

Awards
In 2017, Turley was given the Mormon Historic Sites Foundation Junius Wells Award.

Organizations
Turley has been involved with several genealogical and historical organizations.
 Historic Sites Committee (LDS Church)
 President of the Genealogical Society of Utah (2000–2008),
 The Joseph Smith Papers editorial board
 Executive Committee of the Joseph Fielding Smith Institute for Latter-day Saint History
 General editor of The Journals of George Q. Cannon series
 President of the Salt Lake City Chapter of the Sons of Utah Pioneers (1990)
 Vice President of the Small Museum Administrators Committee, American Association of Museums
 Utah State Historical Records Advisory Board, National Historical Publications and Records Commission
 Copyright Task Force, Society of American Archivists
 Moderator for The Worlds of Joseph Smith conference in 2005

Historical philosophy
In 1992, Turley commented on how Mormon history can affect the faith of LDS Church members:Some people may wish to base their faith on historical evidence. While historical information can be useful, interesting and can provide insights to individuals, I don't think that it's the sure foundation of faith. The sure foundation of faith is spiritual and not physical. ... [T]he more an individual learns about the history of the Church, the greater that individual's understanding will be of the overall picture. Thus, every piece of evidence will be viewed against the total picture. Otherwise, people who do not have much knowledge of Church history may find themselves being tossed to and fro by tidbits from the past.

Publications

Books

.

Edited volumes

.
.
.

Articles and chapters
In addition to the following, Turley contributed seven articles to the Encyclopedia of Latter-day Saint History (2000).

  (video link)  Also published in Joseph: Exploring the Life and Ministry of the Prophet (2005), pp. 230–242.  

.

.
.  Also published in the Utah Historical Quarterly, Winter 2011 issue, pages 92–95.
.
.

Other

References

External links 
 
 Biography at Joseph Smith Papers Project website (accessed May 4, 2012)

1956 births
20th-century Mormon missionaries
21st-century American historians
21st-century American male writers
American Latter Day Saint writers
American Mormon missionaries in Japan
Brigham Young University alumni
J. Reuben Clark Law School alumni
Latter Day Saints from Texas
Latter Day Saints from Utah
Living people
Mormon apologists
Official historians of the Church of Jesus Christ of Latter-day Saints
People from Fort Worth, Texas
Writers from Salt Lake City
Historians from Texas
American male non-fiction writers